Carrichue railway station served Carrichue in County Londonderry in Northern Ireland.

The Londonderry and Coleraine Railway opened the station on 29 December 1852.

It closed on 20 September 1954.

Routes

References

Disused railway stations in County Londonderry
Railway stations opened in 1852
Railway stations closed in 1954
1852 establishments in Ireland

Railway stations in Northern Ireland opened in 1852